All of Us is a 2003 American sitcom.

All of Us may also refer to:

Music
All of Us (band), a New Zealand supergroup that produced "Sailing Away"
All of Us (album), a 1968 album by the late 60s psychedelic pop band Nirvana
All of Us (EP), a 2018 EP by June's Diary
"All of Us" (June's Diary song), a 2016 song by June's Diary
"All of Us" (Pnau song), a 2019 single by Pnau

Other
All of Us (film), 2019 Belgian film
Kulanu, an Israeli political party whose name translates as "All of Us"
All of Us (initiative), a project run by the US National Institutes of Health
All of Us (play), a 2022 play by Francesca Martinez.

See also
All of Us in Our Night, a 2008 album by Modern Skirts
All About Us (disambiguation)